Sayyid Husayn was an Afghan Saqqawist politician who served as minister of defence from January to March 1929. He was appointed by Habibullāh Kalakāni immediately following the capture of Kabul in January 1929 during the Afghan Civil War. In March 1929, he was succeeded by Purdil Khan.  
  
Husayn had been a loyal follower of Kalakāni prior to the civil war, and was intimately involved in the Saqqawist leadership. Robert D. McChesney described him as Kalakāni's "partner and virtual equal in matters of government".
  
He was executed in Kabul on 1 November 1929, alongside Kalakāni and other prominent Saqqawists.

References

1929 deaths
Afghan politicians
Defence ministers of Afghanistan